Svetinja is a small settlement in the Municipality of Trebnje in eastern Slovenia. It lies in the hills east of Dobrnič in the historical region of Lower Carniola. The municipality is now included in the Southeast Slovenia Statistical Region.

References

External links
Svetinja at Geopedia

Populated places in the Municipality of Trebnje